The Port Perry Lumberjacks are a Junior ice hockey team that play in the Provincial Junior Hockey League and based in Port Perry, Ontario, Canada.

History
The Port Perry Lumberjacks joined the Central Lakeshore Junior C Hockey League in 1972 as the Port Perry Flamingos named after their sponsor, Flamingo Tarts. Prior to the 1980–1981 season the team's nickname was changed to MoJacks to coincide with Mother Jackson's Open Kitchens. Over the next thirteen seasons the Mojacks celebrated 8 winning seasons, but failed to win any regular season or playoff crowns.  The league was mostly dominated during this time by the Bowmanville Eagles, amongst others.

Despite finishing fourth in the 1987-88 regular season, the Mojacks won the Central Ontario Junior "C" championship led by head coach George Burnett.  From that point, they entered the Clarence Schmalz Cup All-Ontario championships.  The Mojacks made it to the provincial final, but lost to the Great Lakes Junior C Hockey League's Mooretown Flags 4-games-to-1.

In 1991–1992, four seasons later, the Mojacks finished in first place overall in the league's regular season.  They finished the season with twenty-six wins, six losses, and two ties.  The Mojacks went on to win their second league title, but failed to make a dent in provincials.

In 2005–2006, the Mojacks took over the Central Ontario league.  Port Perry finished the regular season with thirty-two wins, eight losses, and two overtime losses to win the regular season crown.  In the league semi-finals, the Mojacks drew the Lakefield Chiefs.  The Mojacks defeated the Chiefs 4-games-to-1.  In the league final, the Mojacks challenged the third seed Uxbridge Bruins for the league title.  The Mojacks came out on top and won their third league championship 4-games-to-2.  In the All-Ontario playdown quarter-finals, the Mojacks first ran into the Empire B Junior C Hockey League's Napanee Raiders.  The Raiders did not pose much of a threat as Port Perry swept them 4-games-to-none.  The Mojacks came into the provincial semi-finals against the Georgian Mid-Ontario Junior C Hockey League powerhouse Penetang Kings.  The Mojacks made a run at the eventual Clarence Schmalz Cup champions, but fell to the Kings 4-games-to-2.

The 2006–2007 season saw the Port Perry Mojacks finish in second place with twenty-two wins, right behind the Lakefield Chiefs.  In the league semi-finals, the Mojacks challenged a resilient Little Britain Merchants squad.  The series went the distance, but the Mojacks won game seven and the series 4-games-to-3 to earn a birth into the league finals.  The finals saw the Mojacks enter against the top seeded Lakefield Chiefs.  The Chiefs were on a role and showed the Mojacks why they finished in first place, sweeping the series 4-games-to-none.

The 2010–2011 season saw the Mojacks win another Central Ontario League title.  The team however had a short run in the provincials dropping the Quarter final round to the Empire B Champions Picton Pirates 4 games - 1.

Following the 2015–2016 season the seven junior c hockey leagues in Southern Ontario amalgamated under the Provincial Junior Hockey League banner and the Central Ontario Junior C Hockey League became the Orr Division of the East Conference in the new organization.

In the 2018–2019 season, Mojacks Captain Ben Sheremeta became the leading Career Penalty Minutes leader. Over 4 seasons Sheremeta tallied 314 PIMS.

At the end of the 2021–2022 season the Mojacks renamed their team to the Lumberjacks, after their new sponsor Lake Scugog Lumber

Season-by-season results

Schmalz Cup Finals appearances
1988: Mooretown Flags defeated Port Perry Mojacks 4-games-to-1

References

External links
Mojacks Webpage

Ice hockey teams in Ontario